Marisa Lavanchy (born 4 January 1990) is a Swiss sprinter. She competed in the 4 × 100 meters relay at the 2013 and 2015 World Championships without qualifying for the final.

International competitions

1Did not finish in the final

Personal bests
Outdoor
100 metres – 11.42 (+2.0 m/s, Bulle 2014)
200 metres – 23.39 (-0.2 m/s, Zug 2015)

Indoor
60 metres – 7.43 (Magglingen 2014)
200 metres – 23.93 (Magglingen 2013)

References

External links

1990 births
Living people
Swiss female sprinters
World Athletics Championships athletes for Switzerland
Place of birth missing (living people)